The 1924 NCAA baseball season, play of college baseball in the United States organized by the National Collegiate Athletic Association (NCAA) began in the spring of 1924.  Play largely consisted of regional matchups, some organized by conferences, and ended in June.  No national championship event was held until 1947.

Conference realignment and format changes
The Pacific Coast Conference played as a single division.  The Conference split into North and South Divisions for the 1923 season, and resumed divisional play in 1925.  They would maintain divisions until the formation of the Pac-8 Conference.

Conference winners
This is a partial list of conference champions from the 1924 season.

References